Bolle Bay is a cove indenting the western shore of Bouvetøya, entered on the southern side of Norvegia Point. Roughly charted in 1898 by the German expedition under Carl Chun, it was re-charted and named in December 1927 by a Norwegian expedition under Captain Harald Horntvedt.

References

Other sources
Simpson-Housley, Paul  (2002)	Antarctica: Exploration, Perception and Metaphor	(Routledge) 
 

Bays of subantarctic islands
Bodies of water of Bouvet Island